The Duchy of Veragua is a hereditary title in the Peerage of Spain. It was also a Spanish hereditary domain created in 1537 in the reign of King Charles I in a small section of the territory of Veragua (Gobernación de Veragua, which had been created in 1502 and extended along the Caribbean coasts of present-day Nicaragua, Costa Rica, and Panama as far to the east as the Río Belén). The first Duke of Veragua was Admiral Luis Colón y Toledo, grandson and heir of Christopher Columbus.  Holders of this title also hold the title of Admiral of the Ocean Sea. The establishment of the duchy was the resolution of a longstanding dispute between the Spanish Crown and the heirs of Columbus, who had claimed a greater area. Luis Colón was also made Marquess of Jamaica.

The Dukedom was a perfect square of twenty-five leagues on a side, extending towards the west from the mouth of the Río Belén in the Caribbean, in what is today Panamanian territory. As Panama is less than twenty-five leagues in width at this point, the Duchy extended into the Pacific. By this circumstance, the area of the previous territorial division, Castilla de Oro, was split into two separated parts. The western part, from the Gulf of Nicoya to the border of the duchy, was united with Veragua Real (Royal Veragua) in 1540 to create the province of Nuevo Cartago y Costa Rica.

The first Duke of Veragua sent out various expeditions to try to enforce his authority throughout the territory, but they all resulted in disasters due to the resistance of the Indigenous peoples in their homeland and the difficulties of the topography and climate. In one of these expeditions the brother of the Duke, Francisco Colón, died at the hands of the natives.

In 1556 the Duke decided to return the domain to the Crown in exchange for an increased annual rent of 17,000 ducats (which was paid to his heirs up to 1898) and the retention of the title (which is still used in Spain). The current Duke of Veragua bears the same name as his ancestor, Cristóbal Colón.

In 1560, King Philip II created the Province of Veragua from the territory of the duchy, which was placed under the jurisdiction of the Royal Audiencia of Panama. This province corresponds approximately to the present-day Panamanian Veraguas Province.

List of Dukes of Veragua

See also
Veragua
Pleitos colombinos

References
This article is a free translation of the article Ducado de Veragua at the Spanish Wikipedia.

External links
 "Sinopsis histórica de la Provincia de Veraguas"
 GeneaAll.net

Colonial Central America
Colonial Panama
History of Nicaragua
History of Costa Rica
Columbus family
 
Veragua
Spanish colonization of the Americas
1537 establishments in the Spanish Empire
Noble titles created in 1537
1537 in North America
16th century in Central America